Everybody Wants Some!! is a 2016 American teen comedy film written and directed by Richard Linklater, about college baseball players in 1980s Texas. The film stars Blake Jenner, Zoey Deutch, Ryan Guzman, Tyler Hoechlin, Glen Powell, Will Brittain, and Wyatt Russell. It had its world premiere at South by Southwest on March 11, 2016, and was theatrically released in the United States on March 30, 2016, by Paramount Pictures. The film grossed $5.4 million against a $10 million budget but was critically acclaimed.

Plot 
In Texas in the fall of 1980, college freshman Jake Bradford, an all-state pitcher in high school, moves into an off-campus house with other members of the college baseball team including his roommate Billy, nicknamed "Beuter" for his Deep Southern accent. He joins Finnegan, Roper, Dale, and Plummer cruising campus by car, looking for women. Upperclassmen Roper and Finnegan both "strike out" with two women, but one of them, Beverly, says she likes Jake; he makes a note of her room number.

At a team meeting in the house, the coach introduces the new players, including freshmen Jake, Plummer, Beuter, Brumley, and transfer students Jay and Willoughby. The coach cites two rules: no alcohol in the house, and no women upstairs. The team quickly disregards the rules and hosts a drunken party during which several players take women up to their bedrooms. The next morning, Beuter leaves temporarily for home, concerned his girlfriend is pregnant.

The team goes out drinking and "cruising chicks", beginning the night at a local disco. Jay makes arrogant remarks to a bartender, provoking a brawl, and the team is ejected. Jay goes home, and the rest of the team changes clothes and visits a western-themed bar. The next day Willoughby shares his marijuana, music, and philosophy with the freshmen. Jake happens upon Justin, a high school teammate who has embraced punk subculture. He invites the team to a punk concert, and with Jake's encouragement, they go. Jake leaves flowers and a note on Beverly's apartment door that night, then attends a massive party at the team's house.

Beverly calls him in the morning and they agree to meet. She says she is a performing arts major; Jake answers only that he is a baseball player, based on Finnegan's advice. At the team's first unofficial practice, Jay upsets his teammates by pitching aggressively. McReynolds, the team's captain and best player, puts Jay in his place by hitting a home run. The coach arrives unexpectedly and calls Willoughby off the pitcher's mound. It is later revealed that Willoughby is 30 and has been fraudulently transferring to new colleges to continue playing ball and enjoying the student lifestyle.

Beverly invites Jake to "Oz", a costume party thrown by performing arts students. Jake mentions the party to his teammates and tries to tell them they would not enjoy it, but they cajole him into taking them. Although they initially feel out of place, they enjoy themselves all the same. Finnegan is ridiculed by his friends for pretending to be into astrology, and Jake takes part in an improvised Alice in Wonderland–themed take on The Dating Game. Jake and Beverly spend the rest of the night together.

The next morning, the semester begins and Jake and Beverly walk to class together. Two teammates razz Jake for not returning home that night. He runs into Plummer in his classroom, and they settle in for their first lecture. Their history professor enters and writes "Frontiers are where you find them" on the chalkboard. As their first college class officially begins, Jake and Plummer fall asleep.

Cast 

 Blake Jenner as Jake Bradford
 Zoey Deutch as Beverly
 Glen Powell as Walt "Finn" Finnegan
 Tyler Hoechlin as Glen McReynolds
 Ryan Guzman as Kenny Roper
 Wyatt Russell as Charlie Willoughby
 Will Brittain as Billy "Beuter" Autrey
 Austin Amelio as Nesbit
 Temple Baker as Tyrone Plummer
 Juston Street as Jay Niles
 J. Quinton Johnson as Dale Douglas
 Forrest Vickery as Coma
 Tanner Kalina as Alex Brumley
 Michael Monsour as Justin
 Jonathan Breck as Coach Gordan
 Asjha Cooper as Sharon
 Dora Madison Burge as Val

Production 
Linklater wrote the first draft of the film in mid-2005, and tried to finance it in 2009, but could not get production off the ground until Annapurna Pictures became involved.

In August 2014, Linklater ceased involvement on the Warner Bros. film The Incredible Mr. Limpet, saying that he wanted to concentrate on a university-set, 1980s baseball film under the working title That's What I'm Talking About. The project is considered a "spiritual sequel" to Linklater's 1993 film Dazed and Confused, which was set on the last day of high school in 1976. Linklater also considers the film a "spiritual sequel" to Boyhood because "it begins right where Boyhood ends with a guy showing up at college and meeting his new roommates and a girl." The film is based on Linklater's real-life experiences while attending Sam Houston State University in Huntsville, Texas; the original draft of the screenplay was actually intended to be set at Sam Houston State.

In September, Linklater offered Jenner, Hoechlin, Russell, and Guzman roles as members of the baseball team the film focuses on. Hoechlin chose his role over returning to the fifth season of MTV's series Teen Wolf. Later in September, Annapurna Pictures became involved as a financial producer of the film, while Paramount Pictures signed on to handle distribution rights. More cast members were announced, including Deutch, Brittain, and Powell. To create camaraderie among the cast, Linklater had the actors move out to his Austin-area ranch for rehearsals.

Principal photography began on October 13, 2014 in Austin. Filming took place in Weimar, Texas, from October 15 to December 2. Other shooting locations included San Marcos, Texas, Bastrop, Texas, Elgin, Texas and San Antonio. A night shoot involving extras occurred on October 31, 2014, for a costume party scene in Taylor, Texas. Linklater had originally intended to shoot the entirety of the film in Hunstville, Texas, but he could not obtain filming permits and was only allowed to film there for a single day, filming at the actual fraternity house he had lived at while attending Sam Houston State.

Soundtrack

Release 
On July 27, 2015, Paramount Pictures set the film for an April 15, 2016 release in the United States. In February 2016, the film was moved up to April 1, in a limited release. It was then moved to March 30.

The film's debut screening took place at South By Southwest on March 11, 2016. It received another one-time screening at Sam Houston State University, where Linklater himself had gone to college, on March 28, 2016, also featuring a student body Q&A with Linklater, Blake Jenner, Zoey Duetch, and Ryan Guzman. It received its first limited release across 19 locations in New York City, Austin, Houston, and Los Angeles on March 30. On April 22, 2016, Everyone Wants Some!! received its widest release at 454 theaters, peaking at #13 at the box office. By the end of its limited theatrical run, the movie had only brought in $4,644,472, far below its $10 million budget.

Critical response 
On Rotten Tomatoes, 87% of critics gave the film positive reviews based on 244 reviews, with an average rating of 7.60/10. The site's critical consensus reads, "Nostalgic in the best sense, Everybody Wants Some!! finds Richard Linklater ambling through the past with a talented cast, a sweetly meandering story, and a killer classic rock soundtrack." On Metacritic, the film has a score of 83 out of 100 based on 50 reviews, indicating "universal acclaim".

Accolades 
It was nominated as Best Ensemble at the December 19, 2016 Detroit Film Critics Society.
It was also nominated for both Best Feature and the Audience Award at the November 28, 2016 Gotham Independent Film Awards.

References

External links 

 
 
 
 

2016 films
2016 comedy films
2010s coming-of-age comedy films
2010s English-language films
2010s buddy comedy films
2010s sports comedy films
2010s teen comedy films
American baseball films
American buddy comedy films
American coming-of-age comedy films
American sports comedy films
American teen comedy films
Annapurna Pictures films
Films directed by Richard Linklater
Films produced by Megan Ellison
Films set in 1980
Films set in Austin, Texas
Films set in universities and colleges
Films shot in Austin, Texas
Paramount Pictures films
Teen sports films
2010s American films